The Westside Gazette is a newspaper based in Broward County, Florida. It was established to serve an African American audience and is the oldest African-American newspaper in the region.

History
Levi Henry established the Westside Gazette in 1971, reportedly with "$158 and [his] good name". Henry, who began his career selling ads for radio station WRBD his contacts to entice advertisers to his new paper. The paper has broken several stories in South Florida's African-American community, including a 1990 incident in which longtime Fort Lauderdale Mayor Bob Cox told fourth-grade students that in order to be mayor, one had to be "free, white and 21".

A weekly paper, The Westside Gazette is now owned by Levi Henry's son, Bobby Henry. Henry's wife, Bertha Henry, was the Chief Executive of Broward County, Florida (County Administrator) for over a decade. Circulation of the newspaper increased from 10,000 copies in 1971 to 70,000 copies in 2001. PBS correspondent Yamiche Alcindor interned at the paper when she was in high school.

Criticism and controversy
Ties between the paper and local government, which advertises with the paper and funded a Black Journalism Institute led by Bobby Henry, has come into scrutiny. Competing African-American newspapers have alleged that The Westside Gazette inflates circulation numbers.

References

African-American newspapers
Newspapers published in Florida
1971 establishments in Florida
Broward County, Florida